Inside the Human Body is a 2008 album by Ezra Furman & The Harpoons. It was Furman's second officially released album, following the previous year's Banging Down the Doors.

Track listing
 "We Should Fight"
 "Take Off Your Sunglasses"
 "The Stakes Are High"
 "The Dishwasher"
 "The Faceless Boy"
 "Big Deal"
 "If I Was a Baby"
 "The Worm In The Apple"
 "The World Is Alive"
 "Springfield, IL"
 "The Moon"
 "Weak Knees"

References

2008 albums